Spindle may refer to:

Textiles and manufacturing
 Spindle (textiles), a straight spike to spin fibers into yarn
 Spindle (tool), a rotating axis of a machine tool

Biology
 Common spindle and other species of shrubs and trees in genus Euonymus whose hard wood was used to make spindles
 Spindle apparatus or mitotic spindle, a cellular structure in cell biology
 Muscle spindle, stretch receptors within the body of a muscle 
 Spindle neuron, a specific class of neuron
 Sleep spindle, bursts of neural oscillatory activity during sleep
 Spindle transfer, an in vitro fertilization the technique

Computing
 Spindle (hard disk drive), the axis of a hard disk drive
 Spindle (disc packaging), a plastic case for bulk optical disks

Vehicles
 Spindle (automobile), a part of a car's suspension system
 Spindle (vehicle), an autonomous ice-penetrating vehicle

Other uses
 Spindle (furniture), cylindrically symmetric shaft, usually made of wood
 Spindle (sculpture), a 1989 sculpture by Dustin Shuler made from cars
 Spindle (stationery), an upright spike used to hold papers 
 Spindle, part of a door handle
 Spindle Rock, also called Adrachti, a rock in Meteora, Greece

See also

 Fusiform, having a spindle-like shape
 Rotation around a fixed axis
 Spindel, a surname
 Spindler, a surname
 Spindling, in computing
 The Spindles (disambiguation)